Constance Faunt Le Roy Runcie (or Fauntleroy) (January 15, 1836 – May 17, 1911) was an American pianist, author and composer.

Biography
She was born in Indianapolis, Indiana, the granddaughter of Welsh industrial reformer Robert Owen. After her father's death, she studied composition and piano in Germany from 1852–61 and then returned to Indiana.

Faunt Le Roy married minister James Runcie and had four children. The couple lived in St. Joseph, Missouri, where Constance Runcie founded a woman's club to further cultural development of the area. Her daughter Ellinor Dale Runcie was also a writer. Her papers are housed at Missouri Western State University.

Works
Constance Runcie is the author of works including short stories, plays and music compositions. Selected works include:
Literary:
The Burning Question non-fiction
Divinely Led non-fiction
Woman, an essay
The Bab, a novel

She composed for orchestra, chamber ensemble and a number of songs. Selected works include:
Hear Us, Oh, Hear Us
Round the Throne
Silence of the Sea
Merry Life
Tone Poems
Take My Soul, Oh Lord
I Never Told Him
Dover of Peace
I Hold My Heart So Still
My Spirit Rests

References

External links
 

1836 births
1911 deaths
19th-century classical composers
20th-century classical composers
American women classical composers
American classical composers
American music educators
American women music educators
19th-century American composers
19th-century American women writers
19th-century American writers
Writers from Indianapolis
Musicians from Indianapolis
American people of Welsh descent
20th-century American women musicians
20th-century American composers
Educators from Indiana
20th-century women composers
19th-century women composers
19th-century American women musicians